Bright Vision Hospital (BVH) is a 318-bedded public community hospital at 5 Lorong Napiri, Singapore 547530, off Yio Chu Kang Road, in Hougang, Singapore. It was founded by Singapore Buddhist Welfare Services in 2001, who gave ownership of the hospital to SingHealth in 2011 owing to management challenges.

References

External links
 About BVH

Hospitals in Singapore
Hospitals established in 2001
2001 establishments in Singapore